Prayikkara is a village situated in Mavelikara, on the banks of the Achankovil river, in between Mavelikaraa Municipality and Chennithala Panchayat, in Kerala.

Churches
Feast of the Immaculate Conception is celebrated on 8 December every year.

Festivals

Mother Teresa Trophy Boat Race is held along the stretch on the River Achankovil

References

Villages in Alappuzha district